The Night Guardian (Persian: نگهبان شب, romanized: Negahban-e Shab) is a 2022 Iranian drama film directed and produced by Reza Mirkarimi and written by Mirkarimi and Mohammad Davoudi. The film screened for the first time at the 40th Fajr Film Festival and received 9 nominations, where Reza Mirkarimi won the award for Best Director and Aliakbar Osanloo received a Honorary Diploma for his acting.

Premise 
the film is about a naive young village boy named Rasool (Touraj Alvand) whose quiet and carefree life is challenged by trusting Behnam (Mohsen Kiaee), who is the engineer of a construction project.

Cast 

 Touraj Alvand as Rasool
 Laleh Marzban as Nasibeh
 Aliakbar Osanloo
 Safoora Khoshtinat
 Mohsen Kiaee as Behnam
 Vishka Asayesh
 Kiumars Pourahmad
 Fahimeh Hormozi
 Zahra Eslami
 Parham Gholamlou
 Mohammad Sadegh Malek
 Ali Ghabeshi
 Mehrad Akbarabadi
 Iman Salgi
 Navid Bani

Reception

Accolades

References

External links 

 

2022 films
2022 drama films
Iranian drama films
2020s Persian-language films
Films directed by Reza Mirkarimi